Erik Gustafsson (born 24 September 1943) is a Finnish sprinter. He competed in the men's 100 metres at the 1972 Summer Olympics.

References

1943 births
Living people
Athletes (track and field) at the 1972 Summer Olympics
Finnish male sprinters
Olympic athletes of Finland
Place of birth missing (living people)